Butheroo is a civil parish of Napier County, a county of central New South Wales.

Butheroo is on the Butheroo Creek.

References

Localities in New South Wales
Geography of New South Wales
Central West (New South Wales)